Toryal Himat (born 29 October 1997) is an Afghan cricketer. He made his first-class debut for Kunar Province in the 2018–19 Mirwais Nika Provincial 3-Day tournament on 2 March 2019.

References

External links
 

1997 births
Living people
Afghan cricketers
Place of birth missing (living people)
20th-century Afghan people
21st-century Afghan people